Tylomelania tominangensis is a species of freshwater snail with an operculum, an aquatic gastropod mollusk in the family Pachychilidae.

The specific name tominangensis is named after the Tominanga River, where it lives.

Distribution 
This species occurs in the Tominanga River and in Lake Lontoa, south Sulawesi, Indonesia. Its type locality is the Tominanga River near lake Towuti.

Ecology 
The females of Tylomelania tominangensis usually have 1-4 embryos in their brood pouch. Newly hatched snails of Tylomelania tominangensis have a shell height of 6.8-8.5 mm.

References

tominangensis
Gastropods described in 1913